Lorenzo Carotti (born January 31, 1985 in Jesi) is an Italian professional football player currently playing for S.S.D. Jesina Calcio.

He represented Italy at the 2004 UEFA European Under-19 Football Championship and at the 2005 FIFA World Youth Championship.

External links
 
 

1985 births
Living people
Italian footballers
Italy youth international footballers
Serie B players
Serie C players
Como 1907 players
U.S. Cremonese players
Parma Calcio 1913 players
Benevento Calcio players
F.C. Pavia players
Association football midfielders
S.S. Maceratese 1922 players